Cleisthenes, also Clisthenes or Kleisthenes, was a prominent Athenian delegate (theoros) during the Peloponnesian War (431 BC). The comedian Aristophanes used him frequently as the butt of jokes and as a character in his plays, ridiculing him for his sexual tastes. He is notably mentioned in The Frogs, The Clouds, Lysistrata, and Thesmophoriazusae.

References
Acharnians 117,The Clouds, 354,Thesmophoriazusae, 574.
Ancient Library

5th-century BC Athenians
Ancient Greek statesmen
Ancient LGBT people
Aristophanes
Athenians of the Peloponnesian War
Greek LGBT people